Bommalattam or Bommalata may refer to:
 Bommalattam (1968 film)
 Bommalattam (2008 film), the Tamil dub of the Hindi film Final Cut of Director
 Bommalattam (TV series)
 Bommalata (2004 film)